Richard Swinefield (or Richard de Swinfield; died 15 March 1317) was a medieval Bishop of Hereford, England. He graduated doctor of divinity before holding a number of ecclesiastical offices, including that of Archdeacon of London. As a bishop, he dedicated considerable efforts to securing the canonisation of Thomas de Cantilupe, his predecessor, for whom he had worked during his lifetime. Active in his diocese, he devoted little time to politics. He was buried in Hereford Cathedral where a memorial to his memory still stands.

Rise in the Church

Swinefield's last name may come from Swingfield located near Folkestone, Kent. His father was Stephen of Swinfield, who died in 1282, and his brother Stephen remained a layman. No other information about his family and upbringing, including his date of birth, has emerged. He was a doctor of divinity degree, but where he graduated is not known.

By 1264 Richard Swinefield was a member of the household of Thomas de Cantilupe, later to be made Bishop of Hereford in 1275. By 1279 Swinefield held the prebend of Hampton within the diocese, before 1279 and was to hold it until he became a  bishop. Shortly after 17 April 1280 he was named Archdeacon of London, having previously held an unknown prebend in the diocese of London.

Episcopate

Richard Swinefield was elected to the see of Hereford, or bishopric, on 1 October 1282. The election was confirmed by John Peckham, the Archbishop of Canterbury on 31 December 1282, and he entered into possession of the spiritualities and temporalities, or the ecclesiastical and lay income producing properties, of the see by 8 January 1293. He was consecrated on 7 March 1283.

During Richard Swinefield's time as bishop, he was not involved in politics, and spent most of his time in his diocese. He rarely attended Parliament, usually excusing himself on the grounds of urgent diocesan business or his own bad health. He inherited a number of lawsuits from his predecessor, which he managed to settle. He  also resolved a dispute over the boundary between the diocese of Hereford and the Welsh  diocese of St Asaph, to the advantage of Hereford. In his disagreements with the town of Hereford,  he was little inclined to give way and on one occasion threatened excommunication.

Bishop Swinefield was concerned to ensure that his clergy were well treated. He worked to ensure that churches within his diocese were not misappropriated through the granting of custody to unworthy candidates, and was vigilant over monastic houses. His main efforts, though, went toward securing the canonisation of his predecessor Thomas de Cantilupe. This did not however take place until 1320, after Swinefield's death.

Death and legacy

Richard Swinefield died on 15 March 1317, and was buried in Hereford Cathedral, where a memorial in the transept's north wall depicts him in bishop's robes and holding a building. Two of his nephews were given offices within the diocese, with John given the precentorship in Hereford Cathedral, and Gilbert made the chancellor there. Another possible relative was Richard Swinfield, who also held a prebend in the diocese.

A record of Swinefield's expenses as bishop has survived for the years 1289 and 1290. The accounts offer a rare glimpse of the organisation and expenses of a major household at that  period. During the 296 days covered by the record, his household moved 81 times, with 38 of these stops associated with him visiting his diocese during April through June. The record also shows that he supported two scholars at the University of Oxford. The record has been edited a number of times, including by the Camden Society in 1853-1855.

Notes

Citations

References

External links

 

13th-century births
1317 deaths
13th-century English Roman Catholic bishops
14th-century English Roman Catholic bishops
Bishops of Hereford
Burials at Hereford Cathedral